Sphagnopsida is a class of mosses that includes a single subclass Sphagnidae, with two orders. It is estimated it originated about 465 million years ago, along with Takakia. The order Sphagnales contains four living genera: Ambuchanania, Eosphagnum, and Flatbergium, which counts four species in total, and Sphagnum which contains the rest of the species. The extinct Protosphagnales contains a single fossil species.

References

 Shaw, A. Jonathan (2000). "Phylogeny of the Sphagnopsida Based on Chloroplast and Nuclear DNA Sequences". The Bryologist. 103 (2): 277–306.

 
Plant classes